Steyerbromelia deflexa is a plant species in the genus Steyerbromelia. This species is endemic to Venezuela.

References

deflexa
Flora of Venezuela